Court Street Bridge is a historic stone arch bridge located at Rochester in Monroe County, New York. It was designed by city engineer J. Y. McClintock, constructed in 1893, and spans the Genesee River.  It has six shallow arches over the river and two arches over the Johnson and Seymour Raceway and Erie Canal.  Shallow arch spans are 52 feet and rises vary from 13 to 20 feet.

It was listed on the National Register of Historic Places in 1984.

See also
 National Register of Historic Places listings in Rochester, New York

References

External links

Bridges in Rochester, New York
Road bridges on the National Register of Historic Places in New York (state)
Bridges completed in 1893
National Register of Historic Places in Rochester, New York
Stone arch bridges in the United States
1893 establishments in New York (state)